Carbon pricing in Canada is implemented either as a regulatory fee or tax levied on the carbon content of fuels at the Canadian provincial, territorial or federal level. Provinces and territories of Canada are allowed to create their own system of carbon pricing as long as they comply with the minimum requirements set by the federal government; individual provinces and territories thus may have a higher tax than the federally mandated one but not a lower one.

In the absence of a provincial system, or in provinces and territories whose carbon pricing system does not meet federal requirements, a regulatory fee is implemented by the federal Greenhouse Gas Pollution Pricing Act (GHGPPA), which passed in December 2018. In provinces where the fee is levied, 90% of the revenues are returned to tax-payers. The carbon tax is levied because of a need to combat climate change, which resulted in Federal commitments to the Paris Agreement. According to NASA's Jet Propulsion Laboratory (JPL), the air today contains 400 ppm of  while the CO2 level average over the past 400,000 years was between 200 ppm and 280 ppm.

Saskatchewan never had a carbon pricing system and other provinces—Manitoba, Ontario, New Brunswick, and Alberta—have opted out of previous provincial carbon tax systems. Revenue from the federal GHGPPA, which came into effect in April 2019, is redistributed to the provinces, either through tax credits to individual residents or to businesses and organizations that are affected by the tax but are unable to pass on the cost by raising consumer prices.

The introduction of the tax was met with political resistance, mainly by the Conservative Party of Canada which attempted to "make the carbon tax the single issue" of the 2019 federal election campaign. This argument did not succeed, as the Canadian voting public supported parties that also supported the carbon tax, leading CBC News to declare Canada's carbon tax to be "the big election winner" and "the only landslide victor" in this election. 
Similarly, legal challenges to the law failed on  March 25, 2021 when the Supreme Court of Canada rejected the 2019 appeal of the provinces of Manitoba, Ontario, and Saskatchewan, ruling in Reference re Greenhouse Gas Pollution Pricing Act that GHGPPA was constitutional.

History

Alberta becomes first jurisdiction in North America to put price on carbon
In 2003 Alberta signaled its commitment to manage greenhouse gas emissions by passing the Climate Change and Emissions Management Act. One of the first actions taken under this legislation was to develop a mandatory reporting program for large emitters in Alberta.

In March 2007 Alberta passed Specified Gas Emitters Regulation. The first compliance cycle was from July 1 to December 31, 2007.

Quebec implements first carbon tax
In June 2007, Quebec implemented the first carbon tax in Canada which was expected to generate $2 million annually.

On December 11, 2008, ExxonMobil CEO Rex Tillerson said that a carbon tax is preferable to a cap-and-trade program which "inevitably introduces unnecessary cost and complexity". A carbon tax is "a more direct, more transparent and more effective approach". Tillerson added that he hoped that the revenues from a carbon tax would be used to lower other taxes so as to be revenue neutral.

2008: Dion election proposal
An unpopular revenue-neutral carbon tax was proposed in 2008 during the Canadian federal election, by Stéphane Dion, then leader of the Liberal Party. It was Dion's main platform and it allegedly contributed to the defeat of the Liberal Party with its worst share of the popular vote in the country's history.

The Conservative party, who won the 2008 election, had promised to implement a North American-wide cap-and-trade system for greenhouse gases. During the 2008 Canadian federal election, the Conservative party promised to develop and implement greenhouse gas emissions trading by 2015, also known as cap and trade, that encourage a certain type of behaviour through economic incentives regarding the control of emissions and pollution.

2014 Ecofiscal Commission
In 2014 public policy economists and superannuated politicians came together to begin discussions on what would become the Canada’s Ecofiscal Commission. The Commission was established with the participation of Paul Martin, Jim Dinning, Preston Manning, and Jack Mintz on November 4, 2014, and became the leading advocacy group in Canada for carbon pricing. They published reports in 2015, 2016, and 2017.

2015: Trudeau pledges to act if elected
In February 2015, Justin Trudeau announced that he would impose carbon pricing if elected. The proposed system would resemble the medicare model in which provinces would design systems suitable for their needs with the federal government setting national targets and enforcing principles.

2016: Paris Agreement
The Paris Agreement is an agreement within the United Nations Framework Convention on Climate Change (UNFCCC), dealing with greenhouse-gas-emissions mitigation, adaptation, and finance, signed in 2016. The agreement's language was negotiated by representatives of 196 state parties at the 21st Conference of the Parties of the UNFCCC in Le Bourget, near Paris, France, and adopted by consensus on 12 December 2015. Under the Paris Agreement, each country must determine, plan, and regularly report on the contribution that it undertakes to mitigate global warming. No mechanism forces a country to set a specific target by a specific date.

A special report by The Guardian in partnership with Climate Action Tracker, compared pledges made by some 200 countries that participated in the 2015 United Nations round of talks on a "new climate deal" hosted in Paris. The co-authors wrote an in-depth analysis of 14 key countries and blocs, including Canada. The article, which summarized the report, said that Canada climate targets were the "weakest ... of any major industrialised economy which experts say was a "direct result" of Stephen Harper government's hard line policies" and its "promotion" of the "vast reserves of tar sands in Alberta" that are highly polluting".

By December 2016 the ten provinces and the Canadian government presented their "executive, mitigation and adaptation" strategies towards a clean economy. The "extensive document"—"Pan-Canadian Framework on Clean Growth and Climate Change"—"lean[-ed] heavily on carbon pricing".

In 2018, Canada passed the GHGPPA implementing a revenue-neutral carbon tax starting in 2019, which applies only to provinces whose carbon pricing systems created for their jurisdictions, did not meet federal requirements. Revenue from the carbon tax will be redistributed to the provinces.

According to a report by the Canadian Chamber of Commerce (CCC) released on December 13, 2018, Canada's largest business group endorsed the carbon pricing introduced by the federal government saying it offers flexibility and is the "most efficient way to cut emissions" and "solidly backs carbon pricing." According to a December 13 CTV News article, Stewart Elgie, from the Ottawa-based Environment Institute at the University of Ottawa, the CCC's "endorsement of the carbon tax as the most efficient emissions-cutting tool" and its support of "Canada's investments in clean technology at home and abroad", provides the Canadian economy with a "major opportunity...to market itself in a low-carbon future".

In December 2018, the Senate Committee on Agriculture and Forestry submitted their report based on a year-long study on the "impacts of climate change and carbon pricing on agriculture, agri-food and forestry". Although some witnesses raised concerns that Canada's international competitiveness could be diminished compared with producers "who do not bear these additional, carbon-related costs". The Committee noted that a "study of the effects of British Columbia’s carbon tax — which launched in 2008 — suggested the province’s international competitiveness was not diminished". The report recommended that Environment and Climate Change Canada, formerly known as Environment Canada, or EC consider exemptions for agricultural activities under the GHGPPA, with "special attention to competitiveness for producers and food affordability for Canadians". The Committee recommended exempting fuels used for heating or transportation in farming activities.

2018: Canadian government enacts GHGPPA 

The Parliament of Canada passed the Greenhouse Gas Pollution Pricing Act (GHGPPA) in the fall of 2018 under Bill C-74. The GHGPPA refers to charge or pricing instead of taxation. Through the GHGPPA, provinces have the flexibility to create their own solutions to deal with GHG emissions in their own jurisdictions. Through the GHGPPA all provinces are required to place a minimum price of  a tonne of GHG emissions by January 1, 2019. The tax will be retroactive to January.

The federal government plans to send an annual rebate ranging from  adequate emissions pricing plans. The rebate benefit increases each year as the carbon price and the rebate both gradually rise. Taxpayers had to request the Climate Action Incentive Payment (CAIP) rebate on their annual income tax return until filing their 2021 tax return, from which time eligibility for the rebate is automatic and the taxpayer sent a cheque or a direct deposit is made into their bank account.

In her October 23, 2018 Power & Politics podcast, Vassy Kapelos interviewed Dominic LeBlanc, the Minister of Intergovernmental Affairs, Northern Affairs and Internal Trade, Saskatchewan Premier Scott Moe, and Ontario Minister of Environment Rod Phillips.

Carbon pricing in Canada is forecast by Environment Canada to remove 50-60 MT of emissions from the air annually by 2022, which represents about 12% of all Canadian emissions. However, Canada needs to reduce emissions to 512 MT by 2030 to meet its Paris Climate Change accord. This would mean reducing annual emissions by about 200MT from the 2018 levels. In addition to carbon pricing, the government is pursuing a range of additional policies including improving fuel standards, energy efficiency, and closing coal plants.

Forecast economic impact 

According to a 2018 report, British Columbia, which has had a carbon price since 2008, had the fastest growing economy in Canada.

In their April 25, 2019 report, Canada's Parliamentary Budget Officer estimated that the federal government "will generate  in carbon pricing revenues in 2019-20."

However, the Canadian Revenue Agency has declared that, as of June 3, 2019, the average payment to households was less than previously estimated.

2018: Constitutional challenges of GHGPPA

In 2019, the provinces of Manitoba, Ontario, Saskatchewan brought their case to the Supreme Court of Canada. On March 25, 2021, the justices rejected their appeal, ruling in Reference re Greenhouse Gas Pollution Pricing Act that the GHGPPA was constitutional.

2020: Updated federal carbon price, reaching $170 in 2030

Carbon price in individual provinces and territories
By 2018, Quebec (2007), British Columbia (2008), Alberta, Ontario, Manitoba and Nova Scotia had carbon-pricing policies in place. By 2017, Metro Vancouver was "exploring road fares and other fee-based mechanisms to address traffic congestion". Ontario cancelled their cap and trade system in 2018. The outlines of a new climate plan for Ontario, which did not include any carbon pricing system, was unveiled in November 2018.

Manitoba, Ontario, Saskatchewan, and New Brunswick refused to impose their own emissions pricing so the federal pricing came into effect on April 1. Residents of the four provinces pay more for gasoline and heating fuel. The "starting rate added 4.4 cents to the price of a litre of gas, about four cents to a cubic metre of natural gas". The price of propane, butane and aviation fuel will also increase. Residents will receive rebates on their income tax returns. Amounts will vary with each province. In Saskatchewan for example, a family of four will receive $609 in 2019.

British Columbia

The Government of British Columbia introduced a carbon tax in 2008.

British Columbia was the first Canadian province to join the Western Climate Initiative (WCI), which was established in February 2007 by the governors of Arizona, California, New Mexico, Oregon,  and Washington to reduce greenhouse gas emissions. The WCI became an international partnership when BC joined. By 2011, BC's preference was for its existing carbon tax as opposed to the cap and trade proposed by the WCI.

In 2013, Angel Gurría, then-Secretary-General of the Organisation for Economic Co-operation and Development (OECD), said that the "implementation of British Columbia’s carbon tax is as near as we have to a textbook case, with wide coverage across sectors and a steady increase in the rate" over a period of five years.

According to a November 2015 article in The Atlantic, after British Columbia's provincial government introduced a carbon tax in 2008, greenhouse emissions were reduced, "fossil fuel use in British Columbia [had fallen] by 16 percent, as compared to a 3 percent increase in the rest of Canada, and its economy ... outperformed the rest of the country." This proved that carbon tax benefits were "no longer theoretical" and that they did not hinder economic growth.

Quebec

Quebec participates in an international emissions trading scheme with the US state of California.

In June 2007, Quebec implemented a carbon tax on energy distributors, producers, and refiners, the first Canadian province to do so. When announcing the new tax, Quebec Natural Resources Minister Claude Béchard said that industries would absorb the tax, which would total  in revenue annually, instead of passing on the cost to consumers.

Saskatchewan
The Premier of Saskatchewan, Scott Moe, has spoken emphatically against the GHGPPA. The Government of Saskatchewan released a report entitled "Prairie Resilience: A Made-in-Saskatchewan Climate Change Strategy" which he said in an October 23, 2018 interview with CBC's Vassy Kapelos, has been accepted by the federal government as meeting GHGPPA requirements. The federal government assured residents of Saskatchewan that "all direct proceeds collected in Saskatchewan under the federal pollution pricing backstop system" would be paid "through direct payments to individuals and families and investments to reduce emissions, save money, and create jobs". For example, a family of four would "receive $609 in 2019".

Alberta

In November 2015 Premier Rachel Notley and Alberta Environment Minister Shannon Phillips announced Alberta's carbon tax.

In his Maclean's 2015 article, economist Trevor Tombe wrote that "[p]ricing carbon is one of the most sensible policy prescriptions to address greenhouse gas emissions". Tombe listed the advantages and disadvantages. The carbon tax provides a "new source of revenue for the government". The tax is a "far more efficient means of lowering greenhouse gas emissions than regulatory approaches." As part of the process of researching and implementing the carbon tax, the Alberta government worked with a panel chaired by University of Alberta economist Andrew Leach to study a carbon tax based on "sensible, evidence-based policy advice", which Tombe described as "a model for other jurisdictions". The price of the carbon tax began at  a tonne in 2017, rose to  a ton in 2018 and was tied to a 2% increase based on rising inflation, which Tombe considered to be "reasonable". Tombe estimated the impact of the carbon tax on the 3 "most carbon-intensive consumer purchases". He estimated an increase in the price of gasoline of c. 6.7 cents per litre when the  a tonne tax came into effect. "[L]ow to middle-income households" would "receive compensation".

Premier Kenney joined like-minded premiers, including Doug Ford of Ontario, Scott Moe of Saskatchewan and Brian Pallister of Manitoba, in a lawsuit against the federal Liberal government on the carbon tax. The Court of Appeal of Alberta ruled against the federal government. This decision was latter overturned when the Supreme Court of Canada ruled that the federal carbon tax was constitutional.

The first piece of legislation introduced by the newly-elected Premier of Alberta, Jason Kenney, was Bill 1: An Act to Repeal the Carbon Tax. The bill repeals the provincial carbon tax, but it will be replaced by the federal carbon levy.

Ontario

The Ontario Climate Change Mitigation and Low-Carbon Economy Act, 2016 passed by the government of Kathleen Wynne established a standard cap and trade system which integrates with the Western Climate Initiative (WCI) providing access to an "even greater market to buy and sell the most cost effective carbon credits." Gary Goodwin called it the "best and most integrated solution to the problem of emissions."

In September 2017, the Wynne government of Ontario joined the Western Climate Initiative (WCI), which was established in February 2007 by the governors of Arizona, California, New Mexico, Oregon,  and Washington to reduce greenhouse gas emissions. *April 24, 2007: British Columbia joined with the five western states, turning the WCI into an international partnership with the goal of developing a multi-sector, market-based program to reduce greenhouse gas emissions.and link its cap-and-trade system with Quebec’s and California’s in January 2018. This harmonized carbon market will be the second largest in the world, trailing only the EU Emissions Trading System (ETS) and will feature joint permit auctions. Because it allows for permit trading between jurisdictions, linked cap-and-trade systems achieve lower-cost mitigation actions across jurisdictions than an unlinked system.

In October 2018, the newly-elected Progressive Conservative government under premier Doug Ford, cancelled the previous cap and trade system as he had promised in his electoral campaign. In November, the Ontario government unveiled a climate plan which did "not include any kind of price on emissions".

Gas station decals 

In April 2019, the provincial government introduced the Federal Carbon Tax Transparency Act as part of its budget, which makes it mandatory for all gas stations (excluding those situated on Indian reserves) to display government-commissioned decals on their pumps informing customers of the claimed "cost" of the carbon tax—increasing gas prices by 4.4 cents per-litre, and increasing gas prices by up to 11 cents per-litre by 2022. The decals contain a URL for a page on the Ontario web site that explains its positions on the tax, but the decals do not mention the rebate programs. The act became effective August 30, 2019.

Federal Minister of Environment and Climate Change Catherine McKenna accused the Ford government of "wasting taxpayers' dollars on misleading stickers" which failed to acknowledge the rebate programs "or the cost of inaction on climate change". The Act was criticized by the Ontario NDP, with MPP Peter Tabuns accusing Ford of "threatening private business owners with massive fines for failing to post Conservative Party advertisement[s]". Fellow MPP Taras Natyshak issued a letter to the Chief Electoral Officer, alleging that the decals should be considered partisan campaign advertising under the Canada Elections Act due to the then-upcoming federal election. The government defended the decals and Act, considering it "transparency" that reminds Ontario residents of the "costs" of the Liberal carbon tax. Green Party of Ontario leader Mike Schreiner accused Ford of "forcing businesses to be complicit in his anti-climate misinformation campaign", and invited gas stations to help him inform the public that "climate change will cost us more" with his own version of the decal.

The Canadian Civil Liberties Association took the Ontario government to court over the mandatory stickers, arguing the messages were “a form of compelled political expression.” In September 2020, the Ontario Superior Court of Justice sided with CCLA, ruling  that Ford’s mandatory gas-pump decals attacking federal carbon-pricing measures are unconstitutional and violated business owners' freedom of expression.

Northwest Territories
The Government of the Northwest Territories implemented a carbon price that took effect in September 2019.

Output Based Pricing System (OBPS)
Most aspects of the federal government's Output Based Pricing System (OBPS) announced in December 2018, "which targets greenhouse gas emissions from large, industrial facilities", are similar to Alberta's Carbon Competitiveness Incentive Regulation (CCIR) which was also similar to Alberta's 2007 Specified Gas Emitters Regulation (SGER). The three programs had a "price on carbon emissions" and a "system of allocations through which firms receive some number of emissions credits for free." The OBPS rules apply to large facilities in Ontario, New Brunswick, Manitoba, Prince Edward Island, Saskatchewan, Yukon and Nunavut—the "provinces covered by the federal backstop policy." The OBPS covers a "relatively small share of emissions in the provinces it affects." Most emissions come from smaller emitters which "will be covered in large part by the carbon price". A University of Alberta professor of economics named Andrew Leach blogged that "Much of the coverage of this system has framed the OBPS as an exemption from emissions pricing for large emitters, but that hides the importance of the two, linked programs – the carbon price and the output-based allocation of credits."

In the spring of 2018, the federal government had "proposed that all fossil fuel-burning generating stations be treated the same with the first 420 tonnes of greenhouse gases per gigawatt hour of electricity produced exempt from carbon taxes and everything above that subject to a charge."

CBC reported in October 2018 that "natural gas stations face carbon taxes on emissions above 370 tonnes, oil on emissions above 550 tonnes and coal above 800 tonnes, a major concession to coal plants."

Carbon tax and the 2019 federal election
In June 2018, John Ivison wrote in the National Post that the Conservative Party were attempting to make the carbon tax "the single issue" of the 2019 federal election campaign. He argued that Andrew Scheer's leadership had interpreted Doug Ford's election as premier of Ontario as "an explicit rejection of the carbon tax".

See also
 Climate change in Canada

Acts and Regulations for carbon pricing

Notes

References

 

Emissions reduction
Taxation in Canada
Environmental tax
Environmental law
Carbon finance
Low-carbon economy